Vlad Ionuț Muțiu (born 2 February 1995) is a Romanian professional footballer who plays as a goalkeeper for Liga I club FC Hermannstadt.

Honours

Dinamo București
Cupa României runner-up: 2015–16

References

External links
 
 

1995 births
Living people
Sportspeople from Baia Mare
Romanian footballers
Association football goalkeepers
Romania youth international footballers
Liga I players
Liga II players
Liga III players
FC Dinamo București players
SCM Râmnicu Vâlcea players
FCV Farul Constanța players
FC Universitatea Cluj players
FC Hermannstadt players